The Department of Environment, Forestry & Fisheries is one of the departments of the South African government. It is responsible for protecting, conserving and improving the South African environment and natural resources. It was created in 2019 by the merger of the Department of Environmental Affairs with the forestry and fisheries components of the Department of Agriculture, Forestry and Fisheries.

Branches
The branches of the Department of Environmental Affairs are:
 Air Quality and Climate Change
 Biodiversity & Conservation
 Chemicals and Waste Management
 Environmental Advisory Services
 Environmental Programmes
 Legal Authorisations and Compliance Inspectorate
 Oceans and Coasts
 Office of the Chief Operating Officer

Initiatives 
 Working for the Coast

See also
 
 Geography of South Africa#Environmental issues
 
List of ministers of the environment#South Africa

References

External links

 

Environment
Environment of South Africa
South Africa
Environmental
South Africa
South Africa
Forestry in South Africa